WHJC may refer to:

 WHJC (AM), a radio station (1360 AM) licensed to serve Matewan, West Virginia, United States
 WHJC-LP, a low-power television station (channel 27) licensed to serve Williamson, West Virginia